Jonathan Ball may refer to:

People
 Jonathan Ball (footballer) (born 1985), Bermudian footballer
 Jonathan Ball (architect) (born 1947), British co-founder of the Eden Project
 Jonathan Ball (virologist), professor of molecular virology

Other uses
Jonathan Ball Publishers, a South African publishing house owned by Media24